This list of United States Navy aircraft designations (pre-1962) includes prototype, pre-production and operational type designations under the 1922 United States Navy aircraft designation system, which was used by the United States Navy, the United States Marine Corps, and the United States Coast Guard. The list also includes airships, which were designated under different systems than fixed-wing aircraft and rotorcraft until 1954, and naval aircraft that received designations under the 1911 and 1914 U.S. Navy systems, which were sequential by manufacturer and/or aircraft class, and did not convey information about the aircraft's mission.

For aircraft designations under the U.S. Army Air Force/U.S. Air Force system or the post-1962 Tri-Service system—which includes U.S. Navy, Marine Corps and Coast Guard aircraft currently in service—see List of military aircraft of the United States. For Navy, Marine Corps and Coast Guard aircraft that did not receive formal designations—including those procured from 1917 to 1922 when no designation system was in force, and later aircraft that did not receive designations for other reasons—see List of undesignated military aircraft of the United States.

Summary of pre-1962 designation systems

1911 system
The first U.S. Navy designation system, adopted in 1911, consisted of a letter signifying the manufacturer followed by sequential numbers for individual aircraft from each manufacturer. Only heavier-than-air craft (i.e. airplanes) were given designations. The system was subsequently amended to differentiate aircraft classes from the same manufacturer. The designation letters were as follows:

 A – Curtiss Aeroplane Company, landplanes and hydro aeroplanes (i.e. floatplanes)
 B – Wright Company, landplanes and hydro aeroplanes 
 C – Curtiss Aeroplane, flying boats
 D – Burgess and Curtis, landplanes and hydro aeroplanes
 E – Curtiss Aeroplane, amphibians

1914 system
In March 1914, the navy introduced a system similar to hull classification symbols for warships, with an alphabetical code for the aircraft class followed by a sequential number assigned to an individual aircraft. All aircraft designated under the 1911 system that were still in inventory were redesignated. Also consistent with warship designation practices, the designation of the first aircraft of a particular design became the type designation for similar aircraft; for instance, aircraft similar to AH-8 were referred to as AH-8 type.

The aircraft classes and sub-types were as follows:
A – Heavier than air
AH – Aeroplane, Hydro
AB – Flying boat
AX – Amphibian
B – Free balloon
C – Dirigible
D – Kite balloon

This second system was abandoned in May 1917 without immediate replacement; until March 1922, the navy used manufacturers' model designations. However, some later aircraft similar to types with 1914 system designations were given conforming designations, apparently on an informal basis.

1922 system

On 29 March 1922, a new designation system was introduced with a reorganization of U.S. naval aviation under the Bureau of Aeronautics. The system conveyed its information in the form:
(Mission)(Design Number)(Manufacturer)-(Subtype)(Minor Modification)

For example, F4U-1A referred to a minor modification (A) to the first major subtype (1) of Chance-Vought's (U) fourth (4) fighter (F) design.

For the first few years after the system was introduced, the manufacturer's letter and the mission letter were sometimes reversed. If it was the manufacturer's first design for that particular mission, there was no number before the manufacturer letter.

Prototypes under the 1922 system were normally prefixed with "X" (differing from purely experimental X-planes, which were not generally expected to go into production), while pre-production or trials aircraft were usually prefixed "Y", and airships were prefixed "Z" (differing from Army or Air Force use of "Z" to designate obsolete aircraft for storage or disposal).

Airships and balloons 

Prior to 1954, lighter-than-air craft used separate designation systems from those used for fixed-wing aircraft and rotorcraft, or were undesignated. As a general rule, a "Z" prefix identified lighter-than-air craft.

Rigid airships were designated as ZR-class—"R" for rigid—with a suffixed number identifying the individual aircraft. With the introduction of the Akron-class airship, an "S" mission suffix was added to signify scout (ZRS-class).  

The first U.S. Navy non-rigid airship was ordered in 1915 before an airship designation system was standardized and was designated DN-1 for Dirigible, Non-rigid. When subsequent airships were ordered into series production for World War I (WWI), alphabetical class letters were adopted starting with the B-class blimp, with individual aircraft identified by a suffixed number; DN-1 was retroactively considered A-class by implication. Within each class, individual airships often had significant design variations, and were sometimes sourced from different manufacturers; the class designations referred to nominal power and size.

The first mission designation system for non-rigid airships, introduced in 1940, took the following form:
(Construction)(Mission)-(Class)

For example, the ZNP-K referred to K-class (K) patrol (P) non-rigid airship (ZN).

In 1947, this system was replaced by one more similar to the 1922 fixed-wing system, and the "N" for non-rigid was dropped due to the termination of the rigid airship program. The 1947 system took the following form:
(Z for airship)(Mission)(Design Number)(Class)-(Subtype)(Minor Modification)
For example, the ZP2N-1W referred to the airborne early warning modification (W) of the first subtype (1) of the N-class' (N) second (2) patrol (P) airship (Z).  

The airship mission designations were initially "G" for scout, "N" for trainer, and "P" for patrol. In 1947, "N" was changed to "T" for trainers, while "H" for search and rescue and "U" for utility were added, although the latter two mission letters were ultimately not used.

In 1954, the Navy did away with the separate airship designation system and unified it with the main 1922 system, while retaining the "Z" prefix.

Spherical crewed free gas balloons used for airship crew training were considered ZF-class aircraft but never received formal designations and were identified only by serial number and volume; similarly, crewed kite balloons and uncrewed barrage balloons were considered ZK-class, but were undesignated.

Other exceptions
The non-standard XDH designation was applied to two de Havilland aircraft procured in 1927 and 1934 for use by the U.S. Naval Attaché in London.

In 1952, the Navy and Air Force agreed to standardize some flight training curricula and equipment. Accordingly, the T-28 Trojan and T-34 Mentor trainers were adopted and operated by the Navy under their Air Force designations.

1911 system designations, 1911–1914
Data from Baugher, Joe (2006)
 A: Curtiss
A-1 to A-4
 B: Wright
B-1 to B-3
 C: Curtiss
C-1 to C-5
 D: Burgess and Curtis
D-1
 D-2
 E: Curtiss
E-1 - redesignated from A-2 after conversion to amphibian

1914 system designations, 1914–1917
Data from Baugher, Joe (2014) and Swanborough and Bowers (1976), as noted

A: Heavier-than-air

AB: Flying boat 
 AB-1 to AB-5 - Curtiss; redesignated from C-1 through C-5
 AB-6 - Burgess; redesignated from D-1
 AB-7 - Burgess; redesignated from D-2

AH: Aeroplane, Hydro 
 AH-1 to AH-3 - Curtiss; redesignated from A-1, A-3 and A-4
 AH-4 to AH-6 - Wright; redesignated from B-1 through B-3
 AH-7 - Burgess
 AH-8 and AH-9 - Curtiss
AH-10 - Burgess
AH-11 and AH-18 - Curtiss
 AH-19 - Wright
 AH-19 and AH-22 - Martin; conflicting designation, assigned after original AH-19 was rejected

AX: Amphibian 
 AX-1 - Curtiss; redesignated from E-1

B: Free balloon

BC: Kite balloon 
 BC-2 to BC-4 - Goodyear

1922 system designations, 1922–1962

Airborne early warning

W: Airborne early warning (1952–1962) 

 F: Grumman
 WF Tracer – redesignated E-1 in 1962
 W2F Hawkeye – redesignated E-2 in 1962
 U: Vought
 WU
 V: Lockheed
 WV Warning Star – redesignated EC-121 in 1962

Airship

ZP: Patrol (1954–1962) 

 G: Goodyear
 ZPG – redesignated from ZPN and ZP2N in 1954, redesignated Z-1 in 1962

ZS: Scout (1954–1962) 

 G: Goodyear
 ZSG – redesignated from ZP2K, ZP3K, and ZP4K
 ZS2G – redesignated from ZP5K

ZW: Airborne Early Warning (1954–1962) 

 G: Goodyear
 ZWG

Ambulance

A: Ambulance (1943–1962) 
 E: Piper
 AE Grasshopper – redesignated from HE

H: Hospital (1929–1942) 

 E: Piper
 HE Grasshopper – redesignated AE in 1943
 L: Loening
 HL

H: Air-Sea Rescue (1946–1962) 
No designations were assigned in this sequence.

Anti-submarine

S: Anti-submarine (1946–1962) 
In 1946, the "S for Scout" designation was replaced by "S for anti-Submarine", however, the numbers in the 'S' series were not restarted.

 F: Grumman
 SF – skipped to avoid confusion with the SF in the Scout sequence
 S2F Tracker – redesignated S-2 in 1962
 U: Vought
 SU – skipped to avoid confusion with the SU in the Scout sequence
 S2U

Attack

A: Attack (1946–1962) 

 D: Douglas
 AD Skyraider – redesignated from BT2D, redesignated A-1 in 1962
 A2D Skyshark
 A3D Skywarrior – redesignated A-3 in 1962
 A4D Skyhawk – redesignated A-4 in 1962
 F: Grumman
 AF Guardian – redesignated from TB3F
 A2F Intruder – redesignated A-6 in 1962
 H: McDonnell Douglas
 AH Phantom II
 J: North American
 AJ Savage – redesignated A-2 in 1962
 A2J Super Savage
 A3J Vigilante – redesignated A-5 in 1962
 M: Martin
 AM Mauler – redesignated from BTM
 U: Vought
 AU Corsair – redesignated from F4U-6
 A2U Cutlass

Bomber

B: Bomber (1931–1943) 

 D: Douglas
 BD Havoc
 G: Great Lakes
 BG
 B2G
 M: Martin
 BM – redesignated from T5M
 B2M
 N: Naval Aircraft Factory
 BN
 T: Northrop
 BT
 B2T
 Y: Consolidated
 BY Fleetster
 B2Y

BF: Bomber fighter (1934–1937) 

 B: Boeing
 BFB – redesignated from F6B
 C: Curtiss
 BFC Goshawk – redesignated from F11C
 BF2C Goshawk

BT: Bomber torpedo (1942–1945) 

 C: Curtiss
 BTC
 BT2C
 D: Douglas
 BTD Destroyer
 BT2D Destroyer II – redesignated AD in 1946
 K: Kaiser-Fleetwings
 BTK
 M: Martin
 BTM Mauler – redesignated AM in 1946

Drone/missile

BD: Bomber drone (1944) 

 R: Interstate
 BDR

DS: Antisubmarine drone (1959–1962) 
 N: Gyrodyne
 DSN DASH – redesignated H-50 in 1962

KA: Surface-to-air missile (1946–1947) 
For a brief period, surface-to-air missiles used the same designation system as aircraft.

 M: Martin
 KAM Little Joe
 N: Naval Aircraft Factory
 KAN Little Joe
 KA2N Gorgon IIA – redesignated CTV-4 in 1947
 KA3N Gorgon III – redesignated CTV-6 and RTV-4 in 1947
 Q: Fairchild
 KAQ Lark – redesignated SAM-2 in 1947
 S: Sperry
 KAS Sparrow – redesignated AAM-2 in 1947
 Y: Convair
 KAY Lark – redesignated SAM-4 in 1947

KD: Unified sequence (1945–1962) 

 A: Ryan
 KDA Firebee – redesignated QM-34 in 1963
 B: Beechcraft
 KDB Cardinal – redesignated QM-39 in 1963
 KD2B Jayhawk – redesignated QM-37 in 1963
 C: Curtiss-Wright
 KDC
 KD2C Skeet
 KD3C Skeet
 D: McDonnell (changed to H in 1946)
 KDD Katydid – redesignated from TD2D, redesignated KDH in 1946
 G: Globe
 KDG Snipe
 KD2G Firefly
 KD3G Snipe
 KD4G Quail
 KD5G
 KD6G Firefly – redesignated QM-40 in 1963
 H: McDonnell (changed from D in 1946)
 KDH Katydid – redesignated from KDD
 M: Martin
 KDM Plover
 N: Naval Aircraft Factory
 KDN Gorgon – redesignated from TD2N
 KD2N Gorgon – redesignated from TD3N
 R: Radioplane
 KDR Quail – redesignated from TD4D
 KD2R Quail – redesignated QM-36 in 1963
 KD3R – skipped
 KD4R
 T: Temco
 KDT Teal
 U: Vought
 KDU Regulus
 KD2U Regulus II – redesignated QM-15 in 1963

KG: Air-to-surface missile (1946–1947) 
For a brief period, air-to-surface missiles used the same designation system as aircraft.

 N: Naval Aircraft Factory
 KGN Gorgon IIC – redesignated CTV-2 in 1947
 W: Willys-Overland
 KGW Loon – redesignated LTV-1 in 1947

KS: Anti-ship missile (1946–1947) 
For a brief period, anti-ship missiles used the same designation system as aircraft.

 D: McDonnell
 KSD Gargoyle – redesignated from LBD, redesignated RTV-2 in 1947

KU: Research missile (1946–1947) 
For a brief period, research missiles used the same designation system as aircraft.

 D: McDonnell
 KUD Gargoyle – redesignated from LBD, redesignated RTV-2 in 1947
 M: Martin
 KUM Gorgon IV – redesignated PTV-2 in 1947
 N: Naval Aircraft Factory
 KUN Gorgon IIC – redesignated CTV-2 in 1947
 KU2N Gorgon IIA – redesignated CTV-4 in 1947
 KU3N Gorgon III – redesignated CTV-6 and RTV-4 in 1947
 W: Willys-Overland
 KUW Loon – redesignated LTV-1 in 1947

TD: Target drone (1942–1945) 

 C: Culver
 TDC Cadet
 TD2C Turkey
 TD3C
 TD4C
 D: Radioplane
 TDD
 TD2D – skipped to avoid confusion with the McDonnell TD2D
 TD3D – skipped to avoid confusion with the Frankfort TD3D
 TD4D – redesignated KDR in 1945
 D: McDonnell
 TDD – skipped to avoid confusion with the Radioplane TDD
 TD2D Katydid – redesignated KDD in 1945
 D: Frankfort
 TDD – skipped to avoid confusion with the Radioplane TDD
 TD2D – skipped to avoid confusion with the McDonnell TD2D
 TD3D
 L: Bell
 TDL Airacobra – redesignated F2L-1K
 N: Naval Aircraft Factory
 TDN
 TD2N Gorgon – redesignated KDN in 1946
 TD3N Gorgon IIC – redesignated KD2N in 1946
 R: Interstate
 TDR
 TD2R
 TD3R

U: Unpiloted aircraft (1946–1955) 

 C: Culver
 UC

Fighter

F: Fighter (1922–1962) 

 A: General Aircraft
 FA
 A: Brewster
 FA – skipped to avoid confusion with the General Aircraft FA
 F2A Buffalo
 F3A Corsair
 B: Boeing
 FB
 F2B
 F3B
 F4B
 F5B
 F6B – redesignated BFB in 1934
 F7B
 F8B
 C: Curtiss
 FC
 F2C
 F3C
 F4C
 F5C – skipped to avoid confusion with the earlier Curtiss F5L
 F6C Hawk
 F7C Seahawk
 F8C Falcon/Helldiver
 F9C Sparrowhawk
 F10C Helldiver
 F11C Goshawk – redesignated BFC in 1934
 F12C Helldiver
 F13C
 F14C
 F15C
 D: Douglas
 FD
 F2D – skipped to avoid confusion with the McDonnell F2D
 F3D Skyknight – redesignated F-10 in 1962
 F4D Skyray – redesignated F-6 in 1962
 F5D Skylancer
 F6D Missileer
 D: McDonnell (changed to H in 1946)
 FD – redesignated FH in 1946
 F2D Banshee – redesignated F2H in 1946
 F: Grumman
 FF
 F2F
 F3F
 F4F Wildcat
 F5F Skyrocket
 F6F Hellcat
 F7F Tigercat
 F8F Bearcat
 F9F Panther – redesignated F-9 in 1962
 F9F-6/-8 Cougar – redesignated F-9F/J in 1962
 F10F Jaguar
 F11F Tiger – redesignated F-11 in 1962
 F11F-1F/2 Super Tiger – redesignated F-11B in 1962
 F12F – unofficial
 G: Eberhart
 FG
 F2G
 G: Goodyear
 FG Corsair
 F2G Corsair
 H: Hall
 FH
 H: McDonnell (changed from D in 1946)
 FH Phantom – redesignated from FD
 F2H Banshee – redesignated from F2D, redesignated F-2 in 1962
 F3H Demon – redesignated F-3 in 1962
 F4H Phantom II – redesignated F-4 in 1962
 J: Berliner-Joyce
 FJ
 F2J
 F3J
 J: North American Aviation
 FJ Fury
 FJ-2/-3 Fury – redesignated F-1C/D in 1962
 FJ-4 Fury – redesignated F-1E/F in 1962
 K: James V. Martin
 KF
 L: Loening
 FL
 L: Bell
 FL Airabonita
 F2L Kingcobra
 F2L-1K Airacobra
 F3L – unofficial
 M: General Motors
 FM Wildcat
 F2M Wildcat
 F3M Bearcat
 O: Lockheed (changed to V in 1951)
 FO Lightning
 FO – conflicting designation, assigned after the original FO was retired, redesignated FV in 1951
 R: Ryan
 FR Fireball
 F2R Dark Shark
 S: Supermarine
 FS Spitfire – unofficial
 T: Northrop
 FT
 F2T Black Widow
 U: Vought
 FU
 F2U
 F3U
 F4U Corsair
 F5U
 F6U Pirate
 F7U Cutlass
 F8U Crusader – redesignated F-8 in 1962
 F8U-3 Crusader III
 V: Canadian Vickers
 FV Hellcat
 V: Lockheed (changed from O in 1951)
 FV – redesignated from FO
 W: Wright
 WF – skipped to avoid confusion with the Wright WP
 F2W
 F3W Apache
 W: CC&F
 FW – skipped to avoid confusion with the Wright WP
 F2W – skipped to avoid confusion with the Wright F2W
 F3W – skipped to avoid confusion with the Wright F3W
 F4W Bearcat
 Y: Convair
 FY Pogo
 F2Y Sea Dart – redesignated F-7 in 1962

P: Pursuit (1923) 

 W: Wright
 WP

Glider

LB: Bomb glider 

 D: McDonnell
 LBD Gargoyle – redesignated KSD and KUD in 1946
 E: Pratt-Read
 LBE
 P: Piper
 LBP
 T: Taylorcraft
 LBT

LN: Trainer glider (1941–1945) 

 E: Pratt-Read
 LNE
 P: Piper
 LNP Grasshopper
 R: Aeronca
 LNR Grasshopper
 S: Schweizer
 LNS
 T: Taylorcraft
 LNT Grasshopper

LR: Transport glider (1941–1945) 

 A: Allied
 LRA
 LR2A
 G: AGA Aviation
 LRG
 H: Snead
 LRH
 N: Naval Aircraft Factory
 LRN
 LR2N
 Q: Bristol
 LRQ
 W: Waco
 LRW
 LR2W

Helicopters

HC: Crane (1952–1955) 

 H: McDonnell
 HCH

HJ: Utility (1944–1949) 

 D: McDonnell (changed to H in 1946)
 HJD Whirlaway
 H: McDonnell (changed from D in 1946)
 HJH Whirlaway
 P: Piasecki
 HJP Retriever – redesignated HUP in 1950
 S: Sikorsky
 HJS

HO: Observation (1944–1962) 

 C: Convertawings
 HOC
 E: Hiller
 HOE Hornet
 G: Gyrodyne
 HOG Rotorcycle
 K: Kaman
 HOK Huskie – redesignated H-43 in 1962
 S: Sikorsky
 HOS
 HO2S
 HO3S
 HO4S – redesignated UH-19 in 1962
 HO5S

HN: Trainer (1944–1948) 

 S: Sikorsky
 HNS

HR: Transport (1944–1962) 

 B: Boeing Vertol
 HRB Sea Knight – redesignated CH-46 in 1962
 H: McDonnell
 HRH
 P: Piasecki
 HRP Rescuer
 S: Sikorsky
 HRS – redesignated CH-19 in 1962
 HR2S – redesignated CH-37 in 1962
 HR3S Sea King – redesignated CH-3 in 1962

HS: Antisubmarine (1951–1962) 

 L: Bell
 HSL
 S: Sikorsky
 HSS-1 Seabat – redesignated SH-34 in 1962
 HSS-2 Sea King – redesignated SH-3 in 1962

HT: Trainer (1948–1962) 

 E: Hiller
 HTE Raven
 K: Kaman
 HTK Huskie – redesignated H-43 in 1962
 L: Bell
 HTL – redesignated H-13 in 1962

HU: Utility (1950–1962) 

 K: Kaman
 HUK Huskie – redesignated H-43 in 1962
 HU2K Seasprite – redesignated UH-2 in 1962
 L: Bell
 HUL – redesignated H-13 in 1962
 M: McCulloch
 HUM
 P: Piasecki
 HUP Retriever– redesignated UH-25 in 1962
 S: Sikorsky
 HUS Seahorse – redesignated CH-34 in 1962
 HU2S Sea Guard – redesignated HH-52 in 1962

R: Rotorcycle (1954–1959) 

 E: Hiller
 ROE Rotorcycle
 N: Gyrodyne
 RON Rotorcycle

Marine Expeditionary

M: Marine Expeditionary (1922–1923) 

 E: Elias
 EM
 N: Naval Aircraft Factory
 NM

Observation

O: Observation (1922–1962) 

 B: Boeing
 OB
 O2B
 C: Curtiss
 OC Falcon
 O2C Falcon
 O3C Seagull
 D: Douglas
 OD
 O2D
 E: Elias
 EO
 E: Cessna
 OE Bird Dog – redesignated O-1 in 1962
 F: Grumman
 OF Mohawk
 H: Huff Daland
 HO
 J: Berliner-Joyce
 OJ
 K: Keystone
 OK
 L: Loening
 OL
 O2L
 M: Martin
 MO
 M2O
 O3M
 N: Naval Aircraft Factory
 NO
 O2N
 O: Viking
 OO
 P: Pitcairn
 OP
 OP-2
 U: Vought
 UO
 O2U Corsair
 O3U Corsair
 O4U Corsair
 O5U
 Y: Stinson
 OY Sentinel
 Z: Pennsylvania
 OZ

OS: Observation scout (1935–1945) 

 E: Edo
 OSE
 N: Naval Aircraft Factory
 OSN
 OS2N Kingfisher
 S: Stearman
 OSS
 U: Vought
 OSU Corsair
 OS2U Kingfisher

Patrol

P: Patrol (1923–1962) 

 B: Boeing
 PB
 PB Flying Fortress – conflicting designation, assigned after the original PB was canceled
 P2B Superfortress
 P3B
 D: Douglas
 PD
 P2D
 P3D
 F: Grumman
 PF Albatross
 H: Hall
 PH
 P2H
 J: General Aviation
 PJ
 K: Keystone
 PK
 M: Martin
 PM
 P2M
 P3M
 P4M Mercator
 P5M Marlin
 P6M SeaMaster
 P7M SubMaster
 N: Naval Aircraft Factory
 PN
 P2N – redesignated P4N to avoid confusion with the Curtiss P2N
 P3N – skipped
 P4N – redesignated from P2N
 N: Curtiss
 PN – skipped
 P2N
 O: Lockheed (changed to V in 1951)
 PO Warning Star – redesignated WV in 1951
 S: Sikorsky
 PS
 P2S
 V: Lockheed-Vega
 PV Ventura/Harpoon
 P2V Neptune
 V: Lockheed (changed from O in 1951)
 PV – skipped to avoid confusion with the Lockheed-Vega PV
 P2V – skipped to avoid confusion with the Lockheed-Vega P2V Neptune
 P3V Orion
 Y: Consolidated/Convair
 PY
 P2Y
 P3Y Catalina – redesignated PBY in 1935
 P4Y Corregidor
 P5Y Tradewind
 P6Y

PB: Patrol bomber (1935–1962) 

 B: Boeing
 PBB Sea Ranger
 PB2B Canso
 J: North American
 PBJ Mitchell
 M: Martin
 PBM Mariner
 PB2M Mars
 N: Naval Aircraft Factory
 PBN Nomad
 O: Lockheed
 PBO Hudson
 S: Sikorsky
 PBS
 V: Canadian Vickers
 PBV Catalina
 Y: Consolidated
 PBY Catalina – redesignated from P3Y
 PB2Y Coronado
 PB3Y
 PB4Y Liberator
 PB4Y-2 Privateer

PT: Patrol torpedo (1922) 
No designations were assigned in this sequence.

PTB: Patrol torpedo bomber (1937–1962) 
 H: Hall
 PTBH

Racer

R: Racer (1922–1928) 

 B: Bee Line
 BR
 C: Curtiss
 CR
 R2C
 R3C

Scout

S: Scout (1922–1946) 

 C: Curtiss
 CS/SC
 SC Seahawk – conflicting designation, assigned after the original SC was retired
 S2C Shrike
 S3C Falcon
 S4C Helldiver – redesignated SBC in 1935
 DW: Dayton-Wright
 SDW
 E: Bellanca
 SE
 E: Edo
 SE – skipped to avoid confusion with the Bellanca SE
 S2E
 F: Grumman
 SF
 G: Great Lakes
 SG
 HP: Handley Page
 HPS
 L: Loening
 SL
 S2L
 M: Martin
 MS
 S: Sikorsky
 SS
 U: Vought
 SU Corsair
 X: Cox-Klemin
 XS

SB: Scout bomber (1934–1946) 

 A: Brewster
 SBA
 SB2A Buccaneer
 C: Curtiss-Wright
 SBC Helldiver
 SB2C Helldiver
 SB3C
 D: Douglas
 SBD Dauntless
 SB2D Destroyer
 F: Grumman
 SBF
 F: Fairchild
 SBF Helldiver
 G: Great Lakes
 SBG
 N: Naval Aircraft Factory
 SBN
 U: Vought
 SBU Corsair
 SB2U Vindicator
 SB3U
 W: CC&F
 SBW Helldiver

SN: Scout trainer (1939–1948) 

 B: Beechcraft
 SNB Navigator
 C: Curtiss
 SNC Falcon
 J: North American
 SNJ Texan
 SN2J
 V: Vultee
 SNV Valiant

SO: Scout observation (1934–1946) 

 C: Curtiss
 SOC Seagull
 SO2C Seagull
 SO3C Seamew
 E: Bellanca
 SOE
 K: Fairchild
 SOK
 N: Naval Aircraft Factory
 SON Seagull
 R: Ryan
 SOR Seagull
 U: Vought
 SOU – skipped to avoid confusion with the Vought OSU
 SO2U

Tanker

G: Tanker (1958–1962) 
 V: Lockheed
 GV Hercules

Torpedo

T: Torpedo (1922–1935) 

 B: Boeing
 TB
 BS: Blackburn
 BST
 C: Curtiss
 CT
 D: Douglas
 DT
 T2D
 T3D
 E: Detroit
 TE
 F: Fokker
 FT
 G: Great Lakes
 TG
 M: Martin
 MT/TM
 T2M
 T3M
 T4M
 T5M – redesignated BM in 1931
 T6M
 N: Naval Aircraft Factory
 TN
 T2N
 S: Stout
 ST

TB: Torpedo bomber (1935–1946) 

 D: Douglas
 TBD Devastator
 TB2D Skypirate
 F: Grumman
 TBF Avenger
 TB2F
 TB3F Guardian – redesignated AF in 1946
 G: Great Lakes
 TBG
 M: General Motors
 TBM Avenger
 U: Vought
 TBU Sea Wolf
 V: Vultee
 TBV Georgia
 Y: Consolidated
 TBY Sea Wolf

TS: Torpedo scout (1943–1946) 
 F: Grumman
 TSF

Trainer

N: Trainer (1922–1948) 

 B: Boeing
 NB
 N2B
 C: Curtiss
 NC – skipped to avoid confusion with the pre-1922 Curtiss NC
 N2C Fledgling
 E: Piper
 NE Grasshopper
 H: Huff Daland
 HN
 H: Howard
 NH
 J: North American
 NJ
 K: Keystone
 NK
 L: Langley
 NL
 M: Martin
 NM – skipped
 N2M
 N: Naval Aircraft Factory
 NN – skipped
 N2N
 N3N
 N4N – skipped
 N5N
 P: Spartan
 NP
 Q: Fairchild
 NQ
 R: Ryan
 NR Recruit
 S: Stearman
 NS Kaydet
 N2S Kaydet
 T: New Standard
 NT
 T: Timm
 NT – skipped to avoid confusion with the New Standard NT
 N2T Tutor
 V: Vultee
 NV
 Y: Consolidated
 NY
 N2Y
 N3Y
 N4Y

T: Trainer (1948–1962) 

 E: Edo
 TE
 F: Grumman
 TF Trader – redesignated C-1 in 1962
 J: North American
 TJ Texan – redesignated from SNJ-8
 T2J Buckeye – redesignated T-2 in 1962
 T3J Sabreliner – redesignated T-39 in 1962
 O: Lockheed (changed to V in 1951)
 TO Shooting Star – redesignated TV in 1951
 TO-2 Shooting Star – redesignated TV-2 in 1951
 T: Temco
 TT Pinto
 V: Lockheed (changed from O in 1951)
 TV Shooting Star – redesignated from TO
 TV-2 Shooting Star – redesignated from TO-2
 T2V SeaStar – redesignated T-1 in 1962

Transport

G: Transport, single engine (1939–1941) 

 B: Beechcraft
 GB Traveler
 H: Howard
 GH Nightingale
 K: Fairchild
 GK
 Q: Stinson
 GQ Reliant

R: Transport, 1931–1962 

 A: Atlantic
 RA – redesignated TA in 1931
 RA-4
 B: Budd
 RB Conestoga
 C: Curtiss/Curtiss-Wright
 RC Kingbird
 R2C – skipped to avoid confusion with the R2C in the Racer sequence
 R3C – skipped to avoid confusion with the R3C in the Racer sequence
 R4C Condor
 R5C Commando
 D: Douglas
 RD Dolphin
 R2D
 R3D
 R4D – redesignated C-47 in 1962
 R4D-8 – redesignated C-117 in 1962
 R5D – redesignated C-54 in 1962
 R6D – redesignated C-118 in 1962
 E: Bellanca
 RE Skyrocket
 K: Kinner
 RK Envoy
 K: Fairchild (changed to Q in 1942)
 RK – skipped to avoid confusion with the Kinner RK
 R2K
 M: Martin
 RM
 N: Stinson (changed to Q in 1934)
 RN Reliant – redesignated RQ in 1934
 O: Lockheed (changed to V in 1951)
 RO Altair
 R2O Electra
 R3O Electra
 R4O Super Electra
 R5O Lodestar
 R6O Constitution
 R7O Constellation
 Q: Stinson (changed from N in 1934)
 RQ Reliant – redesignated from RN
 R2Q – skipped to avoid confusion with the Fairchild R2Q
 R3Q Reliant
 Q: Fairchild (changed from K in 1942)
 RQ
 R2Q
 R3Q – skipped to avoid confusion with the Stinson R3Q
 R4Q Flying Boxcar – redesignated C-119 in 1962
 R: Ford
 RR
 S: Sikorsky
 RS
 T: Northrop
 RT
 V: Lockheed (changed from O in 1951)
 R6V Constitution
 R7V Constellation
 R7V-2 Super Constellation
 R8V Hercules
 Y: Consolidated/Convair
 RY Liberator Express
 R2Y
 R3Y Tradewind
 R4Y Samaritan

T: Transport (1922–1931) 

 A: Atlantic
 TA

Utility

J: Utility (1931–1955) 

 A: Fokker-America
 JA
 A: Noorduyn
 JA Norseman
 B: Beechcraft
 JB Traveller
 C: Curtiss-Wright
 JC Kingbird
 D: Douglas
 JD Invader
 E: Bellanca
 JE
 F: Grumman
 JF Duck
 J2F Duck
 J3F Goose
 J4F Widgeon
 H: Stearman-Hammond
 JH
 K: Fairchild (changed to Q in 1942)
 JK
 J2K
 L: Columbia
 JL
 M: Martin
 JM Marauder
 O: Lockheed
 JO Electra Junior
 Q: Fairchild (changed from K in 1942)
 JQ
 J2Q
 R: Ford
 JR
 W: Waco
 JW
 J2W

JR: Utility transport (1935–1955) 

 B: Beechcraft
 JRB Expeditor
 C: Cessna
 JRC Bobcat
 F: Grumman
 JRF Goose
 JR2F Albatross – redesignated UF
 K: Nash-Kelvinator
 JRK
 M: Martin
 JRM Mars
 JR2M Mercury
 S: Sikorsky
 JRS
 JR2S

U: Utility (1955–1962) 

 C: de Havilland Canada
 UC Otter – redesignated U-1 in 1962
 U2C Beaver
 F: Grumman
 UF Albatross – redesignated from JR2F, redesignated U-16 in 1962
 O: Piper
 UO Aztec – redesignated U-11 in 1962
 V: Lockheed
 UV JetStar
 UV Hercules – conflicting designation, assigned after the original UV was canceled, redesignated C-130 in 1962

Foreign-built utility aircraft (1920–1962)

  XDH: de Havilland
 XDH-60 Moth
 XDH-80 Puss Moth

Pre-1954 airship systems

Commissioned vessels (1922–1935) 
A series of four airships (two one-offs and two production Akron-class vessels) were the only airships in American history to be commissioned as ships of the United States Navy.  Another airship, ZR-2 (the British R.38) crashed and was destroyed before delivery, and was therefore never commissioned.

 USS Shenandoah (ZR-1)
 ZR-2 – reserved but never commissioned
 USS Los Angeles (ZR-3)
 USS Akron (ZRS-4)
 USS Macon (ZRS-5)

1940 system

ZNN: Training (1940–1946) 

 ZNN-G – redesignated ZTG in 1947
 ZNN-L – redesignated ZTL in 1947

ZNP: Patrol (1940–1946) 

 ZNP-K – redesignated ZPK in 1947
 ZNP-M – redesignated ZPM in 1947
 ZNP-N – redesignated ZPN in 1947

1947 system

ZP: Patrol (1947–1953) 

 ZPK – redesignated from ZNP-K
 ZP2K – redesignated ZSG-2 in 1954
 ZP3K – redesignated ZSG-3 in 1954
 ZP4K – redesignated ZSG-4 in 1954
 ZP5K – redesignated ZS2G-1 in 1954
 ZPM – redesignated from ZNP-M
 ZPN – redesignated from ZNP-N, redesignated ZPG-1 in 1954
 ZP2N – redesignated ZPG-2 in 1954

ZT: Training (1947–1953) 

 ZTG – redesignated from ZNN-G
 ZTL – redesignated from ZNN-L

ZW: Airborne Early Warning (1947–1953) 

 ZWN – redesignated ZPG-3W in 1954

See also
 List of United States Air Force aircraft designations (1919–1962)
 List of United States Army aircraft designations (1956–1962)
 List of United States Tri-Service aircraft designations
 United States military aircraft serial numbers

References

Notes

Citations

Bibliography
 

 Fahey, James C. 1946  U.S. Army Aircraft 1908-1946
 Grossnick, Roy A. United States Naval Aviation 1910–1995. Naval Historical Center

External links
 https://web.archive.org/web/20070306101712/http://www.personal.psu.edu/users/d/o/dob104/aviation/us/index.html
 www.designation-systems.net/index.html
 home.att.net/~jbaugher
 www.aerofiles.com/aircraft.html
 National Museum of the US Air Force
 www.microworks.net/pacific/aviation
 fire.prohosting.com/hud607/uncommon

United States Navy, List of military aircraft of
Aircraft, Naval